Afterglow is the third studio album by English-American hard rock band Black Country Communion. Recorded in June 2012 with regular producer Kevin Shirley, the album was released by J&R Adventures and Mascot Music in October 2012.

Background
Following the release of their second album 2 in 2011, Black Country Communion embarked on a promotional tour of the United States and Europe, and later released the video album Live Over Europe documenting a number of shows on the tour. In January 2012 it was reported that the band would begin work on the follow-up to 2 in June, with a release planned for later in the year. The writing process for the album, according to main songwriter Glenn Hughes, took approximately six months, compared to six weeks for Black Country and four months for 2.

Recording and production
The group began recording sessions for Afterglow on June 10, 2012. As with their previous two albums, BCC released a number of behind-the-scenes video clips of the recording process leading up to the album's announcement. Speaking about the recording of the album, Hughes has praised the vocal sound achieved by producer Kevin Shirley, stating that "We butted heads a little on the first and second albums, simply because we're both control freaks, but this was the record on which Kevin and [I] became friends".

Composition
The majority of the material for Afterglow was written by frontman Glenn Hughes, who has cited Joe Bonamassa's extensive solo touring schedule as the main barrier to the guitarist's heightened involvement in the composition of the album. Speaking for an official press release, Hughes has pointed out, in reference to his approach to Afterglow, that "I wanted to make a record that stood up to the first two, but not to repeat either of those records. There would be absolutely no point beginning it with a song like 'Black Country'".

Music
In the official press release for the album, the sound of Afterglow was described as "Rich in hooks, melodies and choruses", with Hughes pointing out that he wanted the material to have "more acoustic moments than the previous two [albums]", as well as more exposure of keyboardist Derek Sherinian. In a track-by-track overview of the album, Hughes has offered descriptions of a few individual tracks on Afterglow, including "Big Train" ("very quirky and British-sounding"), "Midnight Sun" (which he compared to the sound of The Who), "Confessor" ("slow and groovy" like "No Time" on Black Country), and "Cry Freedom" ("a ZZ Top/Humble Pie kind of a vibe").

Lyrics
In an interview before the announcement of the album, Hughes described the lyrical content of Afterglow as "kind of a continuation [of the band's previous albums]", claiming that "there's gonna be some darker stuff on there, because the lyrics I'm writing are kind of dark". Hughes has also revealed that the potential that the album would be the band's last provided inspiration for the writing of its songs, explaining that "I figured that if this was to be the last album, then I need to come in with some pretty wild and epic tracks".

Release
The first details regarding the band's third album, including the title Afterglow and the cover artwork, were released at the end of August in 2012. The first song to be released from Afterglow was "Confessor", which was made available as a free digital download from the band's official website on September 19, 2012.

Track listing

Personnel

Black Country Communion
 Glenn Hughes – lead vocals, bass guitar, acoustic guitar (track 10)
 Joe Bonamassa – electric guitar, acoustic guitar, co-lead vocals (track 5)
 Jason Bonham – drums, percussion, backing vocals (track 2)
 Derek Sherinian – keyboards
Production personnel
 Kevin Shirley – production, mixing
 Jeff Bova – orchestration (track 6)
 Jared Kvitka – engineering
 Josh LaCount – additional engineering
 Bob Ludwig – mastering
 Marcus Bird – photography and direction

Chart performance

Release history

References

2012 albums
Black Country Communion albums
Albums produced by Kevin Shirley